Judith Beveridge (born 1956) is a contemporary Australian poet, editor and academic. She is a recipient of the Christopher Brennan Award.

Biography
Judith Beveridge was born in London, England, arriving in Australia with her parents in 1960. She started her education at the Auburn North Public School in September 1961, and graduated in 1968 as "Dux of the School" (a title awarded to the student with best aggregate result over all subjects). Completing a BA at UTS she has worked in libraries, teaching, as a researcher and in environmental regeneration. From 2003 until 2018, she taught creative writing at The University of Sydney and was poetry editor for Meanjin from 2005 to 2015, having previously edited Hobo and the Australian Arabic literature journal Kalimat.

Awards and nominations
  Wesley Michel Wright Award
  1988 – Mary Gilmore Prize for The Domesticity of Giraffes
  1988 – New South Wales Premier's Literary Awards, Kenneth Slessor Prize for Poetry for The Domesticity of Giraffes
  1988 – Victorian Premier's Literary Award, C. J. Dennis Prize for Poetry for The Domesticity of Giraffes
  2003 – The Josephine Ulrick Poetry Prize
  2004 – Queensland Premier's Literary Awards, Poetry Collection – Arts Queensland Judith Wright Calanthe Award for Wolf Notes
  2005 – winner of the Philip Hodgins Memorial Medal at the Mildura Writer's Festival
 2013 – Christopher Brennan Award
2015 – Peter Porter Poetry Prize
2015 – New South Wales Premier's Literary Awards, shortlisted, Kenneth Slessor Prize for Poetry for Devadatta's Poems.
2019 – Prime Minister's Literary Awards for Poetry for Sun Music

Bibliography

  The Domesticity of Giraffes, (Black Lightning, 1987) 
  A parachute of blue : first choice of Australian poets. Number one, with Jill Jones & Louise Katherine Wakeling (Round Table Publications, 1995) 
  Accidental Grace, (UQP, 1996) 
  How to Love Bats, and Other Poems (Picaro Press, 2001)OCLC: 57312733
  Wolf Notes, (Giramondo, 2003)  
 Storm and Honey, (Giramondo, 2009) 
The Best Australian Poetry 2006, with Martin Duwell & Bronwyn Lea (UQP, 2006) 
Sun Music: New and Selected Poems, (Giramondo, 2018)

Articles

  Beveridge, Judith. (2001). Four Ascetics, The Literary Review, 45, no. 1, (2001): 152

References

External links
4 poems at Thylazine
Several poems  at Poetry International Web

1956 births
Living people
Australian women poets
Meanjin people